A , meaning "Japanese-style room(s)", and frequently called a "tatami room" in English, is a Japanese room with traditional tatami flooring.  also usually have sliding doors, rather than hinged doors between rooms.
 
Traditionally, most rooms in a Japanese dwelling were in  style. However, many modern Japanese houses have only one , which is sometimes used for entertaining guests, and most other rooms are Western-style. Many new construction Japanese apartments have no  at all, instead using linoleum or hardwood floors.

(See tatami.) Typical room sizes are six or eight tatami mats in a private home. There are also half-sized mats, as in a 4.5-tatami room. 

For sleeping, a futon is laid out in the evening and folded away in the morning. The kotatsu may be particularly important in winter as most Japanese homes do not have central heating.

See also 
 Higashiyama Bunka in Muromachi period

References

Japanese architectural features
Japanese home
Rooms